Hartmannmühle station is a railway station in the Hartmannmühle district of the municipality of Geising, located in the Sächsische Schweiz-Osterzgebirge district in Saxony, Germany.

References

Railway stations in Saxony
Buildings and structures in Sächsische Schweiz-Osterzgebirge
Railway stations in Germany opened in 1890
1890 establishments in Prussia